Henry James (12 December 1919-10 November 1998), was a British former civil servant who served as Downing Street Press Secretary to four prime ministers, most notably Margaret Thatcher during the first year of her premiership in 1979.

Early life 
Henry James was born in Alum Rock, Birmingham and educated at King Edward VI School. He went on to read maths at The University of Birmingham.

Career 
His career began at the Ministry of Health in 1938. A decade later he found himself as editor of the Ministry of National Insurance publication The Window and both London correspondent and drama critic for the Birmingham News from 1947–1951.  

Between 1955 and 1961 he was head of film, television and radio at the Admiralty. In total he spent 32 years with the government information services and served for four years as the head of the Central Office of Information.

In later life Henry James became the first director general of the National Association of Pension Funds, director general for the European Federation for Retirement Provision and served as president of the Institute of Public Relations.

Personal life 
In 1949 he married Sylvia Bickell and remained so until her passing in 1989. Their union bore no children.

References 

Downing Street

Alumni of the University of Birmingham
1919 births
1998 deaths